Slam Dunk is an anime series adapted from the manga of the same title by Takehiko Inoue. The series tells the story of a teenager called Hanamichi Sakuragi who falls in love with a girl named Haruko Akagi, and decides to enter the Shohoku High School Basketball Team in order to attract her, as she is already in love with another Shohoku player, Kaede Rukawa. As Sakuragi starts learning how to play basketball, he begins to take a liking to the sport.

Produced by Toei Animation and directed by Nobutaka Nishizawa, the series aired on TV Asahi from October 16, 1993, to March 23, 1996. Toei compiled the episodes into a series of seventeen DVDs which were released in Japan from December 10, 2004, to May 21, 2005. Toei once again collected the series in three DVD boxes during 2008. All three boxes have a total of seventeen discs.

Toei and Geneon briefly chose to release the anime on DVD after the manga was discontinued, though the anime was also discontinued after only a few volumes. The first DVD was released on March 15, 2005, and volume 4 was the last one released on June 14 of the same year, before they were cancelled. To celebrate the 20th anniversary of its broadcast, the anime was released on Blu-ray in 2014. Episodes 1-85 are the only episodes dubbed into English currently available. Episodes 86-101 were dubbed but currently only remain available subtitled. Various episodes from the series were also downloadable from IGN's Direct2Drive service. Toei is currently streaming episodes of the series online for a fee and for free through Crunchyroll. In May 2009, Joost started streaming all 101 episodes on their website. Each episode is in Japanese, with English subtitles.

The remaining music was composed by Takanobu Masuda. Three CD soundtracks were released during the airing of the series in Japan.

Episode list

References
 General

 Specific

External links
 Slam Dunk Scholarship website at Shueisha 
 Slam Dunk  at Toei Animation
 

Slam Dunk
Episodes